Matt Giusto (born October 25, 1966, in San Francisco, California) is an American track and field athlete.  He competed for the United States, running the 5,000 meters in the 1996 Olympics.

He was a 1984 graduate of San Mateo High School where he was the 1983 national champion at the Foot Locker Cross Country Championships.  He went on to finish third in the 3200 meters at the CIF California State Meet.

While at the University of Arizona he was the 1988 NCAA Champion at 5,000 meters, thus he became the first male athlete to win both the Footlocker National Championship and an NCAA Championship.

By virtue of finishing second at the USA National Cross Country Championships, he ran on the USA team at the 1993 World Cross Country Championships.

He was the 1993 and 1994 USA National Champion at 5,000 meters and also in 1994, the Indoor 3,000 meter champion.

He also took a shot at road running, winning the 1994 national road championship at 5K and the 1996 Crescent City Classic, which also was the national championship race.

References

1966 births
Living people
People from San Mateo, California
American male middle-distance runners
American male long-distance runners
Athletes (track and field) at the 1996 Summer Olympics
Olympic track and field athletes of the United States
Track and field athletes from San Francisco
20th-century American people